Mark James Monk (1858–1929) was a cathedral organist, who served at Truro Cathedral and elsewhere. He was also a composer.

Background

Monk was born on 16 March 1858 in Hunmanby Yorkshire. He studied organ under Edwin George Monk at York Minster. He was a composer of sacred and secular music including Elegaic Odes, a Festival Te Deum, Quintet for wind, and piano and organ pieces. He had a hymn included in Hymns Ancient and Modern He died 5 May 1929 at Blackheath.

Career

Assistant organist of:
York Minster ???? - 1879

Organist of:
St. John's Church, Ladywood, Birmingham 1879 - 1880
St Helen's Church, Ashby-de-la-Zouch 1880 - 1883
Banbury Parish Church 1883 - 1890
Truro Cathedral 1890 - 1920

References

English classical organists
British male organists
Cathedral organists
1858 births
1929 deaths
English composers
People from Hunmanby
Male classical organists